The Jacundá National Forest is a sustainable-use national forest in the state of Rondônia, Brazil.

Location

The forest covers parts of the municipalities of Candeias do Jamari and Porto Velho in the state of Rondônia.
The Samuel Ecological Station, a state-managed unit, lies to the south of the forest.
The terrain is mainly the floodplains of the large and small rivers, surrounded by fluvial terraces.
The forest is bordered by the Madeira River and its right-bank tributaries the Jamari and the Ji-Paraná or Machado River.
The Jacundá, Miriti, Preto and Verde rivers are fed by springs in the forest.

There are three dominant vegetation types including at least 285 tree species in 55 botanical families.
Most of the area is covered by open rainforest, with smaller areas of dense rainforest and savannah, the last of which have little commercial value.
Migratory birds include black-tailed tityra (Tityra cayana), nacunda nighthawk (Chordeiles nacunda), band-rumped swift (Chaetura spinicaudus), fork-tailed flycatcher (Tyrannus savana), solitary sandpiper (Tringa solitaria), vermilion flycatcher (Pyrocephalus rubinus) and purple martin (Progne subis).

Conservation

The Jacundá National Forest was created on 1 December 2004 and is managed by the federal Chico Mendes Institute for Biodiversity Conservation (ICMBio).
It is classed as IUCN protected area category VI (protected area with sustainable use of natural resources).
The purpose is to allow sustainable use of forest resources and scientific research, with emphasis on sustainable exploitation of native forests.
The 2009 annual plan authorized using  for forestry.

The Cuniã-Jacundá Integrated Management (GICJ: Gestão Integrada Cuniã-Jacundá) is a proposed management organization that would take responsibility for three federal conservation units in Rondônia, the Cuniã Ecological Station, Jacunda National Forest and Lago do Cuniã extractive reserve.

Notes

Sources

2004 establishments in Brazil
National forests of Brazil
Protected areas of Rondônia